Betelgeuse is a star in the Orion constellation.

Betelgeuse may also refer to:

Fiction
Betelgeuse (comics), sequel to Franco-Belgian science-fiction comic series Aldebaran
Les bannis de Bételgeuse, 1998 young adult novel by Jean-Louis Trudel
Betelgeuse, a main character played by Michael Keaton in the 1988 American comedy horror fantasy film Beetlejuice
Betelgeuse Romanee-Conti, a character in the Japanese light novel series Re:Zero − Starting Life in Another World

Ships
Betelgeuse, oil tanker destroyed in the 1979 Whiddy Island Disaster
, a U.S.Navy shipname and list of ships by that name
, the last of the cargo ships in service in the United States Navy

See also

Beetlejuice (disambiguation)
Beatlejuice, a Beatles cover band